Long Pond is a lake located by Lakeville, New York. Fish species present in the lake include bluegill, pumpkinseed sunfish, tiger muskie, brown bullhead, yellow perch, black crappie, largemouth bass, and pickerel. There is access via state owned boat launch off NY-41, east of Lakeville.

References

Lakes of New York (state)
Lakes of Chenango County, New York